James Adrian Brown (born 19 June 1984 in Leeds, West Yorkshire, England) is a musician, solo electronic artist, composer and former guitarist and songwriter with the English alternative rock band Pulled Apart By Horses.

He has been described as an icon in the making, throwing himself around the stage with a blatant disregard to health and safety.

Pulled Apart By Horses
Brown formed the band in 2008. They were signed by Transgressive Records in 2009, and released their debut self-titled album Pulled Apart by Horses on 21 June 2010. In August 2011, the band went into Monnow Valley Studio in Wales to record with record producer Gil Norton, and their second album Tough Love was released to critical acclaim on 20 January 2012.

After Tough Love, the band sold out their first European tour, and went on to support Biffy Clyro and Foals. In 2010 they supported Muse at the Manchester County Cricket Ground.

In September 2014 the band's third album Blood became their first top 40, entering the charts at 38. In 2016, Brown and bandmate, Tom Hudson, recorded a take over for Annie Mac and the BBC's Radio 1 in the United Kingdom.

The band's next album, The Haze was released in March 2017 and reached number 12 in the charts.

On the 25th May 2022, after 14 years as the band’s lead guitarist, Brown announced his departure from the band via his Instagram page.

Solo electronic project
Brown embarked upon creating electronic compositions during the nationwide lockdown of the UK brought about by the Covid-19 pandemic in early 2020. It was stated this was a way to combat his ongoing mental health issues and to continue creating music. It wasn't until a year later in October 2021 that the first of these recordings were heard and released by Leeds, West Yorkshire based electronic/ambient record label 'Analog Horizons'. 

The first track 'To Be In Two Places At Once' was released 26th October 2021 and was shortly followed by another single titled 'Everything Follows' released 25th November 2021 and was accompanied by a short psychological horror film shot on Saddleworth Moor in North West England.

A third single titled 'Cadence' released 22nd July 2022, featuring a music video created by an Artificial intelligence program called WZRD built by Xander Steenbrugge. Brown referenced the track as being influenced by 'a world full of algorithms and bots learning what we do and want'.

Alongside writing and releasing his own compositions of original work, Brown has also remixed music by the post-punk band I Like Trains and former Wild Beasts frontman Hayden Thorpe.

Brown has commented on a full length studio album being in the works after plans for an EP have now matured into an LP.

Other musical projects
Since 2017, Brown has been collaborating with the composer Benson Taylor. In 2018 Brown travelled to Beirut, Lebanon to perform with singer songwriter Nadine Shah live and collaborated with her on an original piece of music for a BBC Radio 4 documentary.

It is believed he also began composing and writing original music for TV & film during the latter part of 2018 with Benson Taylor.

In early 2020 Brown collaborated with Welsh poet and play-wright Patrick Jones, British/Singaporean film director Paul Sng (Sleaford Mods: Invisible Britain) and BBC Radio 1 presenter and DJ Huw Stephens. Their collaboration brought about the creation of a short film titled "Ghosts Of '39" which visually follows in the weary footsteps of the Chartists march during the Newport Rising of nearly 200 years ago while bearing witness to the inequality still obvious along the route today. Brown composed an original score for the production featuring live string orchestration and analogue synthesisers.

During the beginning of 2021 Brown announced he had begun working on an original film-score for a Mexican feature film. The post apocalyptic horror production is titled ‘La Ultima Flor del Cerezo’ (The Last Cherry Blossom) with director Héctor Hernández. It is due for release later in 2021.

Awards
Brown received the award for 'Best Original Music Short Film' at the 7 Colors Lagoon, Bacalar International Film Festival in 2023 for his work on ‘La Ultima Flor del Cerezo’ (The Last Cherry Blossom).

Personal life
Brown studied art at college and university for five years in Leeds, UK. He has been a keen gamer since he was a young child. He is a clothing ambassador for the British brand Farah.

In 2012, Brown commented to Clash Magazine what it is like sharing a name with the soul legend, James Brown, "I'll never forget Christmas Day of 2006 when he passed away, I was drunk as a sailor the night before and awoke in the morning to find 26 text messages from friends saying 'R.I.P James' and 'Papa's Got A Brand New Body Bag'. I thought I'd died or something."

Gear
Brown uses a variety of Fender American standard Telecaster electric guitars and a 50 watt Hayden Speakeasy amplifier, which is an all-valve hand-wired head with two channels that have been modified for extra gain. He plays that through a 2x12 cab. Overall Brown is noted for using high gain treble sound so that the two guitar sounds are separated and balanced out.

Brown uses an Ibanez analogue delay pedal for his atmospheric lead guitar parts and a Korg MS-20 synthesizer for his composing work.

Discography

Pulled Apart By Horses Studio albums

References

External links 
 Official Webpage

1984 births
Living people
English male singers
English rock guitarists
Musicians from Leeds
English male guitarists
21st-century English singers
21st-century British guitarists
21st-century British male singers